Share Your Love is the eleventh studio album by country singer Kenny Rogers, released in 1981. Produced by Lionel Richie, it is also Rogers' first with Liberty Records besides his Greatest Hits album. The album has sold nine million copies worldwide.

Overview
Four singles were released from this Share Your Love. "I Don't Need You" charted at number 1 on the US and Canadian country charts as well as reaching the top of the US Adult Contemporary charts, and number 3 on the US Hot 100. The title cut "Share Your Love With Me" reached number 14 on the Hot 100 and 5 in the US Country charts, though it did reach number 2 in Canada and led the US Adult Contemporary charts. Rogers then took a break to release a single from his first Christmas album.  "Blaze of Glory", which featured Kin Vassy on backing vocals, was also released as a single.  Although it was a lesser hit than the first two singles, it still made the top ten. The final single, "Through The Years", returned Rogers to the very top by putting him at No. 1 the Adult Contemporary charts once again.

The album reached No. 1 on the country charts and No. 6 on the pop charts, reaching platinum and double-platinum status in the US and Canada, respectively.

Track listing

Personnel 
Compiled from liner notes.

Musicians
 Kenny Rogers – lead vocals, rhythm track arrangements (4)
 Reginald "Sonny" Burke – keyboards
 Barnaby Finch – keyboards
 Glen Hardin – keyboards
 John Hobbs – keyboards
 Lincoln Mayorga – keyboards (5)
 Sylvester Rivers – keyboards
 James Burton – guitars
 Rickey Harper – guitars
 Paul Jackson Jr. – guitars
 Darrell Jones – guitars
 Thomas McClary – guitars
 Ray Parker Jr. – guitars
 Fred Tackett – guitars
 Billy Joe Walker Jr. – guitars
 Dennis Belfield – bass (2) 
 Joe Chemay – bass (1, 3, 7) 
 Nathan East – bass (5) 
 Abraham Laboriel – bass (6, 8, 9)
 Jerry Scheff – bass (10)
 Freddie Washington – bass (4)
 Ed Greene – drums
 Paul Leim – drums
 Rick Shlosser – drums (5)
 Eddie "Bongo" Brown – percussion
 Ollie E. Brown – percussion
 Paulinho da Costa – percussion (10)
 David Boruff – saxophone solo (2)
 Gary Herbig – saxophone solo (6)
 Gene Page – string, horn and rhythm arrangements
 Edgar Struble – string arrangements (2, 4)
 Harry Bluestone – concertmaster

Backing vocalists
 Track 1: Kin Vassy, Terry Williams, Gene Marford
 Track 2: Terry Williams, Kin Vassy, Cindy Fee, Juanice Charmain 
 Track 3: Deborah Thomas, Kin Vassy, Terry Williams, Cindy Fee
 Track 4: Kin Vassy, Terry Williams, Cindy Fee
 Track 5: none
 Track 6: Gladys Knight & the Pips (Gladys Knight, William Guest, Merald "Bubba" Knight, Edward Patten), Lionel Richie
 Track 7: Lionel Richie, Terry Williams, Cindy Fee
 Track 8: Lionel Richie, Michael Jackson
 Track 9: Kin Vassy, Terry Williams, Deborah Thomas, Brooks Hunnicut
 Track 10: Lionel Richie, Terry Williams, Dorothy Sugarloaf

Technical
 Reginald Dozier – recording and mixing engineer
 Larry Ferguson – second engineer
 Bernie Grundman – mastering at Capitol Studios (Hollywood, CA).
 Michael Mancini – second engineer
 Brenda Harvey-Richie – assistant production
 Lionel Richie – producer
 Kenny Rogers – mixing engineer

Additional credits
 Bill Burks – art direction, design
 Roy R. Guzman – design
 Ken Kragen – management
 Gary Register – photography

Charting History

Weekly Charts

Year-end charts

Charting Singles

External links
[ "Share Your Love" album page at Allmusic]
[ "Share Your Love" album page at Billboard]

References

1981 albums
Kenny Rogers albums
Albums arranged by Gene Page
Liberty Records albums
Albums produced by Lionel Richie